An aisle is, in general, a space for walking with rows of non-walking spaces on both sides. Aisles with seating on both sides can be seen in airplanes, certain types of buildings, such as churches, cathedrals, synagogues, meeting halls, parliaments and legislatures, courtrooms, theatres, and in certain types of passenger vehicles. Their floors may be flat or, as in theatres, stepped upwards from a stage.

Aisles can also be seen in shops, warehouses, and factories, where rather than seats, they have shelving to either side. In warehouses and factories, aisles may be defined by storage pallets, and in factories, aisles may separate work areas. In health clubs, exercise equipment is normally arranged in aisles.

Aisles are distinguished from corridors, hallways, walkways, footpaths, pavements (American English sidewalks), trails, paths and (enclosed) "open areas" by lying between other open spaces or areas of seating, but enclosed within a structure.

Typical physical characteristics

Aisles have certain general physical characteristics:
They are virtually always straight, not curved.
They are usually fairly long. An open space that had three rows of chairs to the right of it and three to the left generally would not be considered an "aisle".

Width of various types of aisles
Theatres, meeting halls, shops, etc., usually have aisles wide enough for 2–3 strangers to walk past each other without feeling uncomfortably close. In such facilities, anything that could comfortably accommodate more than four people side-by-side would generally be considered an "open area", rather than an "aisle".
Factory work area aisles are usually wide enough for workers to comfortably sit or stand at their work area, while allowing safe and efficient movement of persons, equipment and/or materials.
Passage aisles usually are quite narrow—wide enough for a large person to carry a suitcase in each hand but not wide enough for two people to pass side-by-side without touching. Usually, even without luggage one person must turn sideways in order for the other one to pass.
Warehouse aisles normally are at least 8–10 feet (2.4–3 meters) wide, to allow use of mechanical loading equipment.
Wedding aisles are wide enough to allow two people to walk comfortably beside each other and still have space. The width of these aisles varies and is up to those who design the layout of the wedding.
Vehicle aisles are wide enough to allow a designated type of vehicle to pass one or two way. Width generally varies for vehicle type and other variables like no of parking accessibility etc.

Note that spaces between buildings, e. g., rows of storage sheds, would not be considered "aisles", even if the same amount of separation would be considered an aisle in a warehouse.

Architecture
In architecture, an aisle is more specifically the wing of a house, or a lateral division of a large building. The earliest examples of aisles date back to the Roman times and can be found in the Basilica Ulpia (basilica of Trajan), which had double aisles on either side of its central area. The church of St. Peter's in Rome has the same number.

Church architecture

In church architecture, an aisle (also known as an yle or alley) is more specifically a passageway to either side of the nave that is separated from the nave by colonnades or arcades, a row of pillars or columns. Occasionally aisles stop at the transepts, but often aisles can be continued around the apse. Aisles are thus categorized as nave-aisles, transept-aisles or choir-aisles. A semi-circular choir with aisles continued around it, providing access to a series of chapels, is a chevet.

In Gothic architecture, the aisles' roofs are lower than that of the nave, allowing light to enter through clerestory windows. In Romanesque architecture, however, the roofs are at roughly equal heights, with those of the aisle being only slightly lower than that of the nave. In Germany, churches where the roofs of the aisles and nave are the same height, such as St. Stephen's, Vienna, the Wiesenkirche at Soest, St. Martin's, Landshut, and the Frauenkirche (Church of Our Lady) in Munich are known as Hallenkirchen.

When discussing overall design, architectural historians include the centrally-positioned nave in the number of aisles. Thus the original St Peter's Basilica in Rome, Milan Cathedral, Amiens Cathedral, Notre Dame de Paris and  Alexander Nevsky Cathedral in Sofia are all described as having five aisles, meaning they have two side aisles either side of the nave. Antwerp Cathedral even has seven aisles (three at either side of the central nave). In the United Kingdom, cathedrals generally only have one aisle on each side, with Chichester Cathedral, Elgin Cathedral and St Mary Magdalene, Taunton being the only three exceptions.

Supermarkets and retail stores

In supermarkets there are two types of aisles, food aisles and checkout aisles.

Food aisles are where goods are displayed. At the end of food aisles may be found crown end displays, where high-margin goods are displayed for impulse purchase.

In retail stores that do not primarily sell food, aisles containing products would be referred to either generically as merchandise aisles, or by the particular products contained in the aisle, e.g., "the gardening aisle", "the sports equipment aisle".

Checkout aisles contain cash registers at which customers make their purchases. Regardless of the type of merchandise the establishment sells, it is common to display a range of "impulse buy" items along the checkout aisle, such as cold beverages, magazines, candy and batteries. These are often called "lanes" to distinguish them from the food aisles.

Signage
For customer convenience, supermarkets and retail stores commonly number the aisles and have signs indicating both the aisle number and the types of products displayed in that aisle.

Churches, courtrooms, legislatures, and meeting halls may identify individual rows, seats or sections but do not normally assign aisle numbers or display signs regarding aisles.

Libraries

Libraries are commonly divided into several areas:
Circulation desk
Collections, areas where materials are grouped, e.g., Children's Collection. This may include book shelves, manuscripts, photos, etc.
The "stacks", where books are shelved
The Reference Room where materials with limited circulation are stored
Public reading areas containing seats and desks

The spaces between rows of book shelves in the "stacks" area are called aisles and desks in the reading area are frequently arranged in rows with aisles.

Computer server rooms

Server rooms are typically divided into hot and cold aisles for cooling efficiency, and access to servers.

Performance venues

Cinemas, indoor theatres and concert halls

Films, stage plays and musical concerts ordinarily are presented in a darkened facility so the audience can see the presentation better. To improve safety, often the edges of the aisles in such facilities are marked with a row of small lights. The markers frequently are strings of light-emitting diodes (LEDs) because LEDs are durable, have low power consumption and use low voltages that are not subject to electrical codes. To provide a higher level of light focused downward, lighting fixtures referred to as luminaries are often built into the side of the seat facing the aisle.

Stadiums and outdoor arenas

Sport stadiums and outdoor arenas frequently have several types of aisles, including aisles to purchase tickets for events, aisles to enter the main event area and aisles to go to seating. Stadium seating routinely is separated into sections by aisles. Seating rows are accessed by stairsteps. To promote safety, aisles commonly are divided by a handrail in the middle of the aisle.

Stables and barns

The floor plan of aisled barns resembles that of an aisled church. However, the nave in farm buildings is called an aisle thus a "three aisled barn". Aisled barns have the big barn doors on the gable end of the building giving access to the center aisle, often called the drive floor or threshing floor. The side aisles may be the same widths making the barn symmetrical or the aisle where animals were housed may be narrower which is apparent outside the barn because the barn doors are then off-center. The area between the posts, perpendicular to the aisles are called bays. In stables there is a stable aisle down the centre with individual stalls facing the aisle.

Vehicles

Safety and regulatory considerations
National and local government regulations require a minimum width for aisles in various building types. Regulatory agencies frequently inspect buildings, vehicles, etc., to enforce regulations requiring that aisles not be restricted. Inspectors have imposed fines for blocking or restricting passage when boxes or folding chairs are stored in aisles, for example. Insurance companies frequently have safety inspectors to examine the premises, both to determine whether insureds are complying with the insurer's requirements for coverage and to look for any practices that could lead to injury or property damage, including restricting passage in aisles.

The Americans with Disabilities Act sets certain standards for building access and other design considerations in all new construction and major renovations in the U.S. An architectural barrier is any feature that makes access or use of a building difficult, unreasonably dangerous or impossible. This can include aisles that are too narrow for easy access by a wheelchair. Often, the only way to get from a row of chairs, shelves, workstations, etc., to an exit is by an aisle. Historically, many deaths and serious injuries have occurred due to fire, inhalation of smoke or noxious fumes, etc., because blocked or partially blocked aisles prevented persons from promptly leaving a dangerous area.

Regulations applicable to public carriers transporting passengers often require aisles to be completely clear in vehicles, such as airlines, buses and trains. Many insurance companies have requirements regarding minimum aisle width, unrestricted aisles and easy access to exits, and will refuse to insure companies that do not meet their requirements or will increase the premiums on companies that frequently violate the requirements.

See also
Building design
Cathedral diagram
Indoor positioning system
Safety
Soutra Aisle
Wedding ("walking down the aisle")
List of basic architectural topics

Literature
Walter Horn, 'On the Origins of the Medieval Bay System', in: Journal of the Society of Architectural Historians 17 (1958), nr. 2, p. 2–23.

References

External links

A diagram of the aisles in Saint-Benoît-sur-Loire
Penn State College of Agricultural Sciences
ADA Small Business Guide

Architectural elements
Church architecture
Rooms
Building engineering